IMOD can mean: 
Interferometric modulator display - a Qualcomm display technology.
iPod - Apple iPod Modification
Kaavo imod - Cloud Computing Management Application by Kaavo
IMOD (software) - a set of programs used to visualize, reconstruct and segment microscopy images.
Ministry of Defense (Israel) - Israeli Ministry of Defense.

See also 
 Imode (disambiguation)